The Open 50 is a type of monohull sailing yacht and former ISAF international class. It is also known as the IMOCA 50, due to its origin in the International Monohull Open Classes Association.

See also
 Open 60

References

Classes of World Sailing
Keelboats
Box rule sailing classes
IMOCA